Robert Quinlan Costas (born March 22, 1952) is an American sportscaster who is known for his long tenure with NBC Sports, from 1980 through 2019. He has received 28 Emmy awards for his work and was the prime-time host of 12 Olympic Games from 1988 until 2016. He is currently employed by Warner Bros. Discovery Sports, where he does play-by-play and studio work for the MLB on TBS and commentary on CNN. He is also employed by MLB Network, where he does play-by-play and once hosted an interview show called Studio 42 with Bob Costas.

Broadcasting career

Early career
Costas would call Missouri Tigers basketball and co-host KMOX's Open Line call-in program. He did play-by-play for Chicago Bulls broadcasts on WGN-TV during the 1979–1980 NBA season.

NBC Sports

In 1980, Costas was hired by NBC. Don Ohlmeyer, who at the time ran the network's sports division, told 28-year-old Costas he looked like a 14-year-old. 

For many years, Costas hosted NBC's National Football League coverage and NBA coverage. He also did play-by-play for National Basketball Association and Major League Baseball coverage. With the introduction of the NBC Sports Network, Costas also became the host of the new monthly interview program Costas Tonight.

Boxing

On March 30, 2015, it was announced that Costas would join forces with Marv Albert (blow-by-blow) and Al Michaels (host) on the April 11, 2015, edition of NBC's primetime PBC on NBC boxing series. Costas was added to serve as a special contributor for the event from Barclays Center in Brooklyn. He would narrate and write a feature on the storied history of boxing in New York City.

Golf

Costas hosted NBC's coverage of the U.S. Open golf tournament from 2003 to 2014.

Major League Baseball
For baseball telecasts, Costas teamed with Sal Bando (1982), Tony Kubek (from 1983 to 1989), and Joe Morgan and Bob Uecker (from 1994 to 2000). One of his most memorable broadcasts occurred on June 23, 1984 (in what would go down in baseball lore as "The Sandberg Game"). Costas, along with Tony Kubek, was calling the Saturday baseball Game of the Week from Chicago's Wrigley Field. The game between the Chicago Cubs and St. Louis Cardinals in particular was cited for putting Ryne Sandberg (as well as the 1984 Cubs in general, who would go on to make their first postseason appearance since 1945) "on the map". In the ninth inning, the Cubs, trailing 9–8, faced the premier relief pitcher of the time, Bruce Sutter. Sandberg, then not known for his power, slugged a home run to left field against the Cardinals' ace closer. Despite this dramatic act, the Cardinals scored two runs in the top of the tenth. Sandberg came up again in the tenth inning, facing a determined Sutter with one man on base. Sandberg then shocked the national audience by hitting a second home run, even farther into the left field bleachers, to tie the game again. The Cubs went on to win in the 11th inning. When Sandberg hit that second home run, Costas said, "Do you believe it?!" The Cardinals' Willie McGee also hit for the cycle in the same game.

While hosting Game 4 of the 1988 World Series between the Los Angeles Dodgers and Oakland Athletics on NBC, Costas angered many members of the Dodgers (especially the team's manager, Tommy Lasorda) by commenting before the start of the game that the Dodgers quite possibly were about to put up the weakest-hitting lineup in World Series history. That comment ironically fired up the Dodgers' competitive spirit, to the point where a chant of "Kill Costas!" began among the clubhouse, while the Dodgers eventually rolled to a 4–1 series victory.

Besides calling the 1989 American League Championship Series for NBC, Costas also filled in for a suddenly ill Vin Scully, who had come down with laryngitis, for Game2 of the 1989 National League Championship Series alongside Tom Seaver. Game2 of the NLCS took place on Thursday, October 5, which was an off day for the ALCS. NBC then decided to fly Costas from Toronto to Chicago to substitute for Scully on Thursday night. Afterward, Costas flew back to Toronto, where he resumed work on the ALCS the next night.

Costas anchored NBC's pre- and post-game shows for NFL broadcasts and the pre and post-game shows for numerous World Series and Major League Baseball All-Star Games during the 1980s (the first being for the 1982 World Series). Costas did not get a shot at doing play-by-play (as the games on NBC were previously called by Vin Scully) for an All-Star Game until 1994 and a World Series until 1995 (when NBC split the coverage with ABC under "The Baseball Network" umbrella), when NBC regained Major League Baseball rights after a four-year hiatus (when the broadcast network television contract moved over to CBS, exclusively). It was not until 1997 when Costas finally got to do play-by-play for a World Series from start to finish. Costas ended up winning a Sports Emmy Award for Outstanding Sports Personality, Play-by-Play.

In 1999, Costas teamed with his then-NBC colleague Joe Morgan to call two weekday night telecasts for ESPN. The first was on Wednesday, August 25 with Detroit Tigers playing against the Seattle Mariners.

On August 3, 2019, Costas alongside Paul O'Neill and David Cone called both games of a double-header between the New York Yankees and Boston Red Sox for the YES Network. Costas was filling in for Michael Kay, who was recovering from vocal cord surgery.

On August 20, 2021, reports emerged that TBS was nearing an agreement with Costas to host their coverage of that year's NLCS.

NASCAR

In November 2017, it was announced that Costas would alongside Krista Voda, co-anchor NBC's pre-race coverage leading into the NASCAR Cup Series finale from Homestead. In addition to hosting pre-race coverage, Costas would conduct a live interview with incoming NBC broadcaster Dale Earnhardt Jr., who was running his final race.

National Basketball Association

Costas served as NBC's lead play-by-play announcer for their National Basketball Association broadcasts from 1997-2000. In that time frame, Costas called three NBA Finals including the 1998 installment (which set an all-time ratings record for the NBA) between the Chicago Bulls and Utah Jazz. Costas was paired with Isiah Thomas and Doug Collins on NBC's NBA telecast. Following the 2000 NBA Finals, Costas stepped down from the lead play-by-play in favor of Marv Albert, who was incidentally, the man that Costas directly replaced on the NBA on NBC in the first place.

Costas had previously presided as host of the network's pre-game show, NBA Showtime, while also providing play-by-play as a fill-in when necessary. Costas later co-anchored (with Hannah Storm) NBC's NBA Finals coverage in 2002, which was their last to-date (before the NBA's network television contract moved to ABC).

Professional football

NBC Sports allowed Costas to opt out from having to cover the XFL. He publicly denigrated the league throughout its existence and remains a vocal critic of the league and its premise.

In 2006, Costas returned to NFL studio hosting duties for NBC's new Sunday Night Football, hosting its pre-game show Football Night in America. Costas last hosted NFL telecasts for NBC in 1992 before being replaced in the studio by Jim Lampley and subsequently, Greg Gumbel. Before becoming the studio host for The NFL on NBC in 1984, Costas did play-by-play of NFL games with analyst Bob Trumpy.

Costas is nicknamed "Rapping Roberto" by New York City's Daily News sports media columnist Bob Raissman. Al Michaels also called him "Rapping Roberto" during the telecast between the Indianapolis Colts and the New York Giants on September 10, 2006, in response to Costas calling him "Alfalfa".

Olympics (1988–2016)
Costas has frontlined many Olympics broadcasts for NBC. They include Seoul in 1988, Barcelona in 1992, Atlanta in 1996, Sydney in 2000, Salt Lake City in 2002, Athens in 2004, Torino in 2006, Beijing in 2008, Vancouver in 2010, London in 2012, Sochi in 2014 and Rio in 2016. He discusses his work on the Olympic telecasts extensively in a book by Andrew Billings entitled Olympic Media: Inside the Biggest Show on Television. A personal influence on Costas has been legendary ABC Sports broadcaster Jim McKay, who hosted many Olympics for ABC from the 1960s to the 1980s.

During the 1992 Barcelona and 1996 Atlanta Opening Ceremonies, Costas's remarks on China's teams' possible drug use caused an uproar among the American Chinese and international communities. Thousands of dollars were raised to purchase ads in The Washington Post and Sunday The New York Times, featuring an image of the head of a statue of Apollo and reading: "Costas Poisoned Olympic Spirit, Public Protests NBC". However, Costas's comments were made subsequent to the suspension of Chinese coach Zhou Ming after seven of his swimmers were caught using steroids in 1994. Further evidence of Chinese athletes' drug use came in 1997 when Australian authorities confiscated 13 vials of Somatropin, a human growth hormone, from the bag of Chinese swimmer Yuan Yuan upon her arrival for the 1997 World Swimming Championships. At the World Championships, four Chinese swimmers tested positive for the banned substance Triamterene, a diuretic used to dilute urine samples to mask the presence of anabolic steroids. Including these failed drug tests, 27 Chinese swimmers were caught using performance-enhancing drugs from 1990 through 1997; more than the rest of the world combined.

Along with co-host Meredith Vieira and Matt Lauer, Costas's commentary of the 2012 Summer Olympics Opening Ceremonies came under fierce criticism, with Costas being described as making "a series of jingoistic remarks, including a joke about Idi Amin when Uganda's team appeared" and the combined commentary as being "ignorant" and "banal".

Following the Olympics, Costas appeared on Conan O'Brien's talk show and jokingly criticized his employer for its decision to air a preview of the upcoming series Animal Practice over a performance by The Who during the London closing ceremonies. "So here is the balance NBC has to consider: The Who, 'Animal Practice'. Roger Daltrey, Pete Townshend—monkey in a lab coat. I'm sure you'd be the first to attest, Conan, that when it comes to the tough calls, NBC usually gets 'em right," Costas said, alluding at the end to O'Brien's involvement in the 2010 Tonight Show conflict.

An eye infection Costas had at the start of the 2014 Winter Olympics forced him, on February 11, 2014, to cede his Olympic hosting duties to Matt Lauer (four nights) and Meredith Vieira (two nights), the first time Costas had not done so at all since the 1998 Winter Olympics (as the rights were not held by NBC).

Thoroughbred racing
From 2001 until 2018, Costas co-hosted the Kentucky Derby. In 2009, he hosted Bravo's coverage of the 2009 Kentucky Oaks. After Costas officially departed from NBC Sports, his role on NBC's thoroughbred racing coverage was essentially filled-in by Rebecca Lowe, beginning with the 2019 Kentucky Derby.

Departure from NBC Sports
On February 9, 2017, Costas announced during Today that he had begun the process of stepping down from his main on-air roles at NBC Sports, announcing in particular that he would cede his role as primetime host for NBC's Olympics coverage to Mike Tirico (who joined the network from ESPN in 2016), and that he would host Super Bowl LII as his final Super Bowl. However, Costas ultimately dropped out of the coverage entirely.

USA Today reported that he would similarly step down from Football Night in America in favor of Tirico. Costas explained that he was not outright retiring and expected to take on a role at NBC Sports similar to that of Tom Brokaw, being an occasional special correspondent to the division. He explained that his decision "opens up more time to do the things that I feel I'm most connected to; there will still be events, features, and interviews where I can make a significant contribution at NBC, but it will also leave more time for baseball (on MLB Network), and then, at some point down the road, I'll have a chance to do more of the long-form programming I enjoy." Costas told USA Today his gradual retirement was planned in advance, and that he did not want to announce it during the 2016 Summer Olympics or the NFL season because it would be too disruptive, and joked: "I'm glad that Sochi wasn't the last one. You wouldn't want your pink-eye Olympics to be your last Olympics."

Costas's final major on-air broadcast for NBC was hosting the 2018 Belmont Stakes, where Justify won the Triple Crown.

On January 15, 2019, it was announced that Costas had officially departed from NBC Sports after 40 years.

Talk show hosting
Costas hosted the syndicated radio program Costas Coast to Coast from 1986 to 1996, which was revived as Costas on the Radio. Costas on the Radio, which ended its three-year run on May 31, 2009, aired on 200 stations nationwide each weekend and syndicated by the Clear Channel owned Premiere Radio Networks. During that period, Costas also served as the imaging voice of Clear Channel-owned KLOU in St. Louis, Missouri, during that station's period as "My 103.3". Like Later, Costas's radio shows have focused on a wide variety of topics and have not been limited to sports discussion.

Costas decided to leave Later after six seasons, having grown tired of the commute to New York City from his home in St. Louis and wishing to lighten his workload in order to spend more time with his family. He also turned down an offer from David Letterman, who moved to CBS in 1995, to follow him there and become the first host of The Late Late Show, which was being developed by Letterman's company to air at 12:30 after the Late Show with David Letterman.

In June 2005, Costas was named by CNN president Jonathan Klein as a regular substitute anchor for Larry King's Larry King Live for one year. Costas, as well as Klein, have said Costas was not trying out for King's position on a permanent basis. Nancy Grace was also named a regular substitute host for the show. On August 18, 2005, Costas refused to host a Larry King Live broadcast where the subject was missing teenager Natalee Holloway. Costas said that because there were no new developments in the story, he felt it had no news value, and he was uncomfortable with television's drift in the direction of tabloid-type stories.

Beginning in October 2011, Costas was a correspondent for Rock Center with Brian Williams. He gained acclaim for his November 2011 live interview of former Pennsylvania State University assistant coach Jerry Sandusky concerning charges of sexual abuse of minors, in which Sandusky called in to deny the charges.

Costas hosted a monthly talk show Costas Tonight on NBC Sports Network.

HBO Sports
In 2001, Costas was hired by HBO to host a 12-week series called On the Record with Bob Costas.

In 2002, Costas began a stint as co-host of HBO's long-running series Inside the NFL. Costas remained host of Inside the NFL through the end of the 2007 NFL season. He hosted the show with Cris Collinsworth and former NFL legends Dan Marino and Cris Carter. The program aired each week during the NFL season.

Costas left HBO to sign with MLB Network in February 2009.

On April 23, 2021, it was announced that Costas would be returning to HBO to host a quarter-yearly interview show called Back on the Record.

MLB Network
At the channel's launch on January 1, 2009, Costas hosted the premiere episode of All Time Games, a presentation of the recently discovered kinescope of Game5 of the 1956 World Series. During the episode, he held a forum with Don Larsen, who pitched MLB's only postseason perfect game during that game, and Yogi Berra, who caught the game.

Costas joined the network full-time on February 3, 2009. He hosted a regular interview show titled MLB Network Studio 42 with Bob Costas as well as special programming and provides play-by-play for select live baseball game telecasts. In 2017, Costas called Game1 of the American League Division Series between the Boston Red Sox and the Houston Astros on MLB Network. The Astros went on to win 8–2. Costas and his color commentator Jim Kaat received criticism for their "bantering about minutia" and misidentification of plays. Costas also went on to become an internet meme after using the term the "sacks were juiced" to describe the bases being loaded.

NFL Network
As aforementioned, Costas hosted Thursday Night Football on NBC and NFL Network in 2016, having returned to broadcasting after a brief absence. He was replaced by Liam McHugh in 2017.

TBS
On August 20, 2021, Andrew Marchand of the New York Post reported that TBS was nearing an agreement with Costas which would have him hosting the network's National League Championship Series coverage. On October 7, 2021, WarnerMedia officially confirmed that Costas would be joining TBS for their postseason baseball coverage starting on October 16.

As of the 2022 MLB season, Costas currently provides play-by-play for TBS's Tuesday night baseball package during the regular season. He will also be the studio host for TBS's ALCS postseason coverage and provide play-by-play for TBS's ALDS postseason coverage between the Cleveland Guardians and New York Yankees. This marked the first time since the 2000 ALCS on NBC that Costas would provide play-by-play for a postseason baseball series in its entirety.

Other appearances
Costas provided significant contributions to the Ken Burns, PBS mini series Baseball as well as its follow-up The 10th Inning. He also appears in another PBS film, A Time for Champions, produced by St. Louis's Nine Network of Public Media.

In July 2020, it was announced that Costas would join CNN as a contributor. According to CNN, Costas would provide commentary "on a wide range of sports-related issues as the industry adapts to new challenges posed by the coronavirus and the frequent intersection of sports with larger societal issues." Costas, who would continue working on MLB Network, said of joining CNN: “CNN’s willingness to devote time and attention to sports related topics, makes it a good fit for me.”

Notable calls

June 23, 1984: Costas called NBC's Game of the Week with Tony Kubek, where Ryne Sandberg hit two separate home runs in the 9th and 10th innings against Bruce Sutter to tie the game. This game is known as "The Sandberg Game".

Costas's call of the first home run:
Into left center field, and deep. This is a tie ball game!

Costas's call of the second home run:
Costas: 1–1 pitch. [Sandberg swings] 
Kubek: OHHH BOY! 
Costas: [Over Kubek] And he hits it to deep left center! Look out! Do you believe it, it's gone! We will go to the 11th, tied at 11.

October 28, 1995: Costas called Game 6 of the 1995 World Series, where the Atlanta Braves finally won their first ever World Series championship since moving to Atlanta in 1966.
Left-center field, Grissom on the run. The team of the '90s has its World Championship!

October 26, 1997: Costas called Game 7 of the 1997 World Series, where Édgar Rentería hit a walk off single to give the Florida Marlins their first World Series championship. Costas's call:
The 0–1 pitch. A liner, off Nagy's glove, into center field! The Florida Marlins, have won the World Series!

June 14, 1998: Costas called Game 6 of the 1998 NBA Finals, Michael Jordan and Phil Jackson's final game with the Chicago Bulls where Jordan hit a 20-foot jumpshot to put the Bulls up 87–86 with 5.2 seconds remaining. The Bulls would win the game by that score, giving them their sixth championship and third consecutive. Costas's call:

Jordan with 43. Malone is doubled. They swat at him and steal it! Here comes Chicago. 17 seconds. 17 seconds, from Game 7, or from championship #6. Jordan, open, CHICAGO WITH THE LEAD! Timeout Utah, 5.2 seconds left. Michael Jordan, running on fumes, with 45 points.

June 4, 2000: Costas called Game 7 of the 2000 Western Conference Finals for NBC's NBA coverage. Kobe Bryant threw an alley oop pass to Shaquille O'Neal to give the Lakers a six-point lead with 41.3 seconds remaining. Costas's call of the play:
Portland has three timeouts left, the Lakers have two. Bryant... TO SHAQ!

September 25, 2014: Costas called Derek Jeter's final game at Yankee Stadium for MLB Network, where he hit an RBI single to win the game. Costas's call:
A base hit to right! Here comes Richardson, they're waving him home! The throw, it's close but he scores! On a walk off hit by Derek Jeter!

June 26, 2015: Costas called Pedro Strop's atrocious performance at Busch Stadium for MLB Network, where he gave up a home run for a blown save. Costas's call:
Strop is on his way out, pointing towards the heavens. We can only ask, or wonder, that he's asking some departed relative for forgiveness for this atrocious performance.

Interests

Love of baseball

Costas is a devoted baseball fan. He's been suggested as a potential commissioner and wrote Fair Ball: A Fan's Case for Baseball in 2000. For his 40th birthday, then Oakland Athletics manager Tony La Russa allowed Costas to manage the club during a spring training game. The first time Costas visited baseball legend Stan Musial's St. Louis eatery, he left a $3.31 tip on a ten dollar tab in homage to Musial's lifetime batting average (.331). Costas delivered the eulogy at Mickey Mantle's funeral. In eulogizing Mantle, Costas described the baseball legend as "a fragile hero to whom we had an emotional attachment so strong and lasting that it defied logic". Costas has even carried a 1958 Mickey Mantle baseball card in his wallet. Costas also delivered the eulogy for Musial after his death in early 2013.

Costas was outspoken about his disdain for Major League Baseball instituting a playoff wild card. Costas believed it diminishes the significance and drama of winning a divisional championship. He prefers a system in which winning the wild card puts a team at some sort of disadvantage, as opposed to an equal level with teams who outplayed them over a 162-game season. Or, as explained in his book Fair Ball, have only the three division winners in each league go to the postseason, with the team with the best record receiving a bye to the League Championship Series. Once, on the air on HBO's Inside the NFL, he mentioned that the NFL regular season counted for something, but baseball's was beginning to lose significance. With the advent of the second wild card, Costas has said he feels the format has improved, since there is now a greater premium placed on finishing first. He has suggested a further tweak: Make the wild card round a best two of three, instead of a single game, with all three games, if necessary, on the homefield of the wild card of the better record.

He also has disdained the Designated Hitter rule, saying baseball would be a better game without it.

Costas serves as a member of the advisory board of the Baseball Assistance Team, a 501(c)(3) non-profit organization dedicated to helping former Major League, Minor League, and Negro league players through financial and medical difficulties.

Political views

Costas considers himself left of center but has said that he has voted for Republican candidates at times as well. On May 26, 2007, Costas discussed the presidency of George W. Bush on his radio show, stating he liked Bush personally, and had been optimistic about his presidency, but said the course of the Iraq war, and other mis-steps have led him to conclude Bush's presidency had "tragically failed" and considered it "overwhelmingly evident, even if you're a conservative Republican, if you're honest about it, this is a failed administration." The following summer, Costas interviewed Bush with a very friendly and cordial encounter during the president's appearance at the 2008 Summer Olympics in Beijing.

Controversies

Gun culture controversy

During a segment on the Sunday Night Football halftime show on December 2, 2012, Costas paraphrased Fox Sports columnist Jason Whitlock in regard to Jovan Belcher's murder-suicide the day prior, saying the United States' gun culture was causing more domestic disputes to result in death, and that it was likely Belcher and his girlfriend would not have died had he not possessed a gun.

Critics interpreted his remarks as support for gun control. Many (including former Republican presidential candidates Mike Huckabee and Herman Cain) felt Costas should not have used a program typically viewed as entertainment to publicize political views on sensitive topics, Lou Dobbs criticized his remarks for supporting the abolition of the Second Amendment by quoting a sports writer, while Andrew Levy remarked that he had been given a civics lecture by someone who had "gotten rich thanks in part to a sport that destroys men's bodies and brains". However, reporter Erik Wemple of The Washington Post praised Costas for speaking out for gun control on the broadcast, commenting that the incident's connection to the NFL provided him with an obligation to acknowledge the incident during the halftime show, stating that "the things that [NFL players] do affect the public beyond whether their teams cover the point spread. And few cases better exemplify that dynamic as powerfully as the Belcher incident."

During the following week, Costas defended his remarks in an appearance on MSNBC's program The Last Word with Lawrence O'Donnell, where he said the remarks were related to the country's gun culture, and not about gun control as critics had inferred. Costas did suggest that more regulation be placed on America's gun culture:

Now, do I believe that we need more comprehensive and more sensible gun control legislation? Yes I do. That doesn't mean repeal the Second Amendment. That doesn't mean a prohibition on someone having a gun to protect their home and their family. It means sensible and more comprehensive gun control legislation. But even if you had that, you would still have the problem of what Jason Whitlock wrote about, and what I agree with. And that is a gun culture in this country.

2014 Winter Olympics

During his coverage of the 2014 Winter Olympics, Costas was criticized by some conservative members of the media, including Michelle Malkin and Glenn Beck, for supposedly praising Vladimir Putin's role in defusing tensions surrounding Syria and Iran. Several media commentators, including Bill O'Reilly and Bernard Goldberg, defended Costas's remarks as factually correct and pointed out that Costas had also voiced considerable criticism of both Russia and Putin while broadcasting from Sochi. During an interview on Fox News, Goldberg said "...the idea that Costas somehow portrayed Vladimir Putin as a benign figure is ridiculous." Costas defended himself on O'Reilly's broadcast on March 3, reiterating that he criticized Putin immediately preceding, and following, the statements that were questioned. O'Reilly then aired a portion of an Olympic commentary in which Costas was pointedly critical of the Russian leader. Costas also indicated that Senator John McCain, who had been among those who had initially criticized Costas, had called Costas to apologize after hearing the full segment in context.

Football's future

While visiting the University of Maryland in November 2017 for a roundtable discussion on various sports topics, Costas said the sport of football was in a decline, with evidence mounting that the repetition of concussions "destroys people's brains" and he wouldn't allow a son with athletic talent to play it. Costas had been scheduled to work Super Bowl LII, his eighth as a host (despite stepping down from Football Night in America in favor of his successor Mike Tirico, Costas was to return while Tirico prepped to lead NBC's coverage of the 2018 Winter Olympics, set to begin a few days later). However, the network announced shortly before the game that Liam McHugh would instead join Dan Patrick as a co-host, leading to speculation that NBC removed Costas from the NFL's biggest game over his comments. Costas originally denied such, saying it made more sense for McHugh, who had been hosting Thursday night games on NBC, to serve in that capacity. However, he later admitted in an interview with ESPN's Outside the Lines that the comments were indeed the basis of his removal, ultimately resulting in his departure from the network after forty years.

Personal life

Costas is the son of a Greek father, John George Costas and an Irish mother, Jayne Costas (née Quinlan). Costas was married from 1983 to 2001 to Carole "Randy" Randall Krummenacher. They had two children, son Keith (born 1986) and daughter Taylor (born 1989). Costas once jokingly promised Minnesota Twins center fielder Kirby Puckett that, if he was batting over .350 by the time his child was born, he would name the baby Kirby. Kirby was hitting better than .350, but Bob's son initially was not given a first (or second) name of Kirby. After Puckett reminded Costas of the agreement, the birth certificate was changed to "Keith Michael Kirby Costas".

On March 12, 2004, Costas married his second wife, Jill Sutton. Costas and his wife now reside primarily in New York.  Although Costas was born and raised in the New York area, he has often said he thinks of St. Louis as his hometown.

Costas's children have also won Sports Emmys: Keith has won two as an associate producer on MLB Network's MLB Tonight, and Taylor as an associate producer on NBC's coverage of the 2012 Summer Olympics.

Awards and honors
29-time Emmy Award winner
Eight-time NSMA National Sportscaster of the Year
Four-time American Sportscasters Association Sportscaster of the Year 
Star on the St. Louis Walk of Fame.
1999 Curt Gowdy Media Award – Basketball Hall of Fame
2000 TV Guide Award for Favorite Sportscaster. 
2001 George Arents Award from Syracuse University (Excellence in Sports Broadcasting)
2004 Dick Schaap Award for Outstanding Journalism 
NSMA Hall of Fame inductee (class of 2012).
2012 Walter Cronkite Award for Excellence in Journalism.
2013 S.I. Newhouse School of Public Communications Marty Glickman Award for Leadership in Sports Media.
2017 Ford C. Frick Award – National Baseball Hall of Fame.
Sports Broadcasting Hall of Fame inductee (class of 2018)

In popular culture

Films

In 1994, Costas appeared as the play-by-play announcer for the World Series (working alongside Tim McCarver) in the movie The Scout. In 1998, he appeared as himself along with his rival/counterpart Al Michaels from ABC in the movie BASEketball. Costas voiced an animated car version of himself, Bob Cutlass, in the movies Cars (2006) and Cars 3 (2017). He also appeared as himself in the 2001 movie Pootie Tang, where he remarks that he saw "the longest damn clip ever".

Costas's voice appeared in the 2011 documentary film Legendary: When Baseball Came to the Bluegrass, which detailed the humble beginnings of the Lexington Legends, a minor league baseball team located in Lexington, Kentucky.

In 2021, Costas played himself in Here Today directed by Billy Crystal.

Popular culture

Costas has been alluded to several times in popular music. The songs "Mafioso" by Mac Dre, "We Major" by Domo Genesis and "The Last Huzzah" by Mr. Muthafuckin' eXquire, all refer to Costas. He was also mentioned in a Ludacris song after Costas mentioned the rapper on the late night talk show Last Call with Carson Daly.

In June 2013, Costas provided the voice of God in the Monty Python musical Spamalot at The Muny Repertory in St. Louis.

Television guest roles
Apart from his normal sportscasting duties, Costas has also presented periodic sports blooper reels, and announced dogsled and elevator races, on Late Night with David Letterman.

In 1985, Costas appeared on The War to Settle the Score, a pre-WrestleMania program that the World Wrestling Federation aired on MTV.

In 1993, Costas hosted the "pregame" show for the final episode of Cheers. Costas once appeared on the television program NewsRadio as himself. He hosted an award show and later had some humorous encounters with the crew of WNYX. Costas also once appeared as a guest on the faux talk show cartoon Space Ghost Coast to Coast. He also had a recurring guest role as himself on the HBO series Arli$$.

Costas has been impersonated several times by Darrell Hammond on Saturday Night Live. Costas was "supposed" to appear in the fourth-season premiere of Celebrity Deathmatch (ironically titled "Where is Bob Costas?") as a guest-commentator, but about halfway through the episode it was revealed that John Tesh had killed him before the show to take his place.

In 1999, Costas appeared as a guest on Space Ghost Coast to Coast during its sixth season.

On June 13, 2008, Costas appeared on MSNBC's commercial-free special coverage of Remembering Tim Russert (1950–2008).

On January 30, 2009, Costas guest-starred as himself on the television series Monk in an episode titled "Mr. Monk Makes the Playoffs"'. He mentions to Captain Stottlemeyer about how Adrian Monk once helped him out of a problem several years ago with regards to a demented cat salesman. He apparently sold Costas a cat that allegedly tried to kill him with a squeeze toy. (In fact when he signs off he says, "The cat was definitely trying to kill me.")

Costas guest-voiced as himself in 2010 Simpsons episode, "Boy Meets Curl", when Homer and Marge make the U.S. Olympic curling team. Costas also guest-voiced as himself on the Family Guy episode "Turban Cowboy" in an interview with Peter after he wins the Boston Marathon by hitting everyone with his car.

On February 11, 2010, Stephen Colbert jokingly expressed his desire to stab Costas with an ice pick at the upcoming 2010 Winter Olympics in Vancouver so Colbert could take over as host. Costas later made a cameo appearance on the February 25, 2010, edition of Colbert's show.

In January 2013, Costas appeared as himself in the Go On episode "Win at All Costas" with Matthew Perry, wherein Ryan King auditions with him for a TV show.

Real footage of Costas from NBC's pregame show before Game5 of the 1994 NBA Finals was used in the second episode of The People v. O.J. Simpson: American Crime Story.

Costas appeared on the September 22, 2017, episode of Real Time with Bill Maher to discuss issues such as concussions and the role of political activism in professional sports (namely by Colin Kaepernick).

Video games

In 2002, Costas was the play-by-play announcer, alongside Harold Reynolds, for Triple Play 2002 during the ballgame for PlayStation 2 and Xbox.

Career timeline
1974–1976: Spirits of St. Louis Play-by-play, KMOX radio
1976–1981: Missouri Tigers men's basketball Play-by-play, KMOX radio
1976–1979: NFL on CBS Play-by-play
1979–1980: Chicago Bulls Play-by-play, WGN-TV
1980–2018: NBC Sports Play-by-play & studio host
1980–1983: NFL on NBC Play-by-play
1983–1989: MLB on NBC #2 play-by-play
1984–1992, 2006–2016: NFL on NBC Studio Host
1988–1994: Later Host
1990–1997, 2002: NBA on NBC Studio Host
1992–2016: Summer Olympics Primetime Host
1993: Notre Dame Football on NBC Alternate play-by-play
1994–2000: MLB on NBC Lead play-by-play
1997–2000: NBA on NBC Lead play-by-play
2001–2018: Thoroughbred Racing on NBC Lead host
2001–2009: On the Record with Bob Costas and Costas Now Host
2002–2014: Winter Olympics Primetime Host
2002–2008: Inside the NFL Host
2003–2014: U.S. Open host, NBC Sports
2008–2012: NHL Winter Classic Host
2009–present: MLB Network Studio 42 with Bob Costas Host (2009-2014), Thursday Night Baseball Play-by-play
2016: NBC/NFL Network Host, Thursday Night Football
2017–present: MLB Network play-by-play, MLB Postseason
2020–present: CNN Sports contributor
2021–present: TBS baseball studio host, 2021 NLCS

See also

New Yorkers in journalism

References

External links

Bob Costas Ford C. Frick Award biography at the National Baseball Hall of Fame

 
 

 
 

 
 

 
 

 
 

 
 

1952 births
Living people
Sportspeople from Queens, New York
Writers from Queens, New York
People from Commack, New York
Radio personalities from New York (state)
Sportswriters from New York (state)
American male journalists
American Basketball Association announcers
American horse racing announcers
American sports radio personalities
American talk radio hosts
American television sports anchors
American television talk show hosts
American writers of Greek descent
American people of Irish descent
Chicago Bulls announcers
College basketball announcers in the United States
College football announcers
Figure skating commentators
Golf writers and broadcasters
Late night television talk show hosts
Major League Baseball broadcasters
Missouri Tigers men's basketball announcers
MLB Network personalities
Motorsport announcers
National Basketball Association broadcasters
National Football League announcers
National Hockey League broadcasters
NBC Sports
Olympic Games broadcasters
St. Louis Cardinals (football) announcers
St. Louis Blues announcers
Tennis commentators
S.I. Newhouse School of Public Communications alumni
Spirits of St. Louis
Ford C. Frick Award recipients
Sports Emmy Award winners
20th-century American journalists
21st-century American journalists
20th-century American writers
21st-century American writers